Waterloo, New Jersey may refer to:

 Waterloo, Monmouth County, New Jersey
 Waterloo Village, New Jersey in Byram Township, Sussex County